Bāb Ḥuṭṭa ( or) is a neighborhood in the Muslim Quarter of the Old City of Jerusalem to the north of the Haram al-Sharif (Temple Mount).  The name literally means "Forgiveness (or Remission) Gate", referring to the Remission Gate of the Haram compound, connected by Bāb Ḥuṭṭa Street.

History
In the late 15th century, Mujir ad-Din described it as one of the largest quarters in Jerusalem.  A census taken by the Ottoman authority registered only Muslims in the quarter.  At the beginning of the 20th century, the quarter had boundaries defined as follows:
 North and east - the city walls between St Stephen's Gate and Herod's Gate. The northeast corner is the Stork Tower (Burj al-Laqlaq).
 South - the north side of the Temple Mount.
 West - Zawiyat el-Hunud Street, 'Aqabet er-Rahibat, Bab el-Ghawanima Street.

In the 19th century, Jews were an increasing percentage of Jerusalem's population, and began to spread out of the Jewish Quarter into the Muslim Quarter. Jewish families settled in Bab al-Hutta by 1837.

Demographics
The neighborhood is considered one of the poorest areas in the Old City. It is home to the Dom Romani community of the Old City, known in Arabic as al-Nawar, led by mukhtar Abed-Alhakim Mohammed Deeb Salim.

References

Arab neighborhoods in Jerusalem
Nawar people
Romani communities in Asia
Romani in Israel
Romani in the State of Palestine
Muslim Quarter (Jerusalem)